Mouza bint Suhail Al Khaili is an Emirati royal and one of Zayed bin Sultan's spouses.

Background
Sheikha Mouza is from Al Bu Khail branch of the Manasir tribe.

Marriage and children
Sheikha Mouza married Zayed bin Sultan Al Nahyan, founding ruler of the United Arab Emirates. They had five sons: Sheikh Saif, Sheikh Hamed, Sheikh Omar, Sheikh Ahmed and Sheikh Khalid.

References

20th-century Emirati women
Mouza
Living people
Spouses of presidents of the United Arab Emirates
Date of birth missing (living people)
Year of birth missing (living people)
21st-century Emirati women
Princesses by marriage